Marco Bergamo may refer to:
 Marco Bergamo (cyclist) (born 1964), Italian cyclist
 Marco Bergamo (serial killer) (1966–2017), Italian serial killer known as The Monster of Bolzano